Nematocerus is a genus of beetles belonging to the family Curculionidae.

The species of this genus are found in Africa.

Species:
 Nematocerus adenensis Voss, 1962 
 Nematocerus aereus Marshall, 1944

References

Curculionidae
Curculionidae genera